The Battle of Elizabethtown occurred on August 27, 1781 in Elizabethtown, North Carolina in Bladen County, North Carolina. The battle was fought between Patriot troops under the command of Thomas Robeson and Thomas Brown and the Loyalist North Carolina militia commanded by John Sligsby and David Godden. The day before the battle, a local resident named Sallie Salter entered the Loyalist camp to sell eggs. Unknown to the Loyalist forces, Sallie was a spy for the Patriot cause. She reported to Colonels Thomas Robeson and Thomas Brown, commanders of a band of the Bladen County militiamen. The information Salter provided to both men led to them making a decision to attack the Loyalist encampment. Despite the fact that the Patriot forces were significantly outnumbered, Robeson and Brown fabricated a plan in which their forces would appear to be greater in number by masquerading false commands to "phantom" soldiers, intended to be heard by the enemy. The Patriot forces approached the Loyalist camp at night and launched a surprise attack. John Sligsby and David Godden were both mortally wounded and many of the soldiers fled the area into a ravine near the river, which has been known as "Tory Hole" ever since. Today, a state historic marker entitled with the name of the battle denotes the site of the engagement. It reads as follows: "Whigs broke Tory power in Bladen Co., August, 1781, driving them into Tory Hole, 50 yards N."

References 

Battles of the American Revolutionary War in North Carolina